Dave Brady (died April 1, 1988) was an American sportswriter for The Washington Post. He was the 1973 Dick McCann Memorial Award recipient from the Pro Football Hall of Fame.

Career
Brady graduated from St. Joseph's University in Pennsylvania, and was a sports writer and editor with the Camden Courier-Post in New Jersey from 1930 to 1943, and again in 1946. He served in the merchant marine and worked for the Army Transport Service in the Pacific during World War II.

After the war ended, Brady joined The Washington Post in 1946, starting as a sports desk editor and a boxing authority, before beginning his football writing career. Brady would choose and cover the "game of the week": the best pro football game anywhere in the country.

Personal life
He married Mary Agnes Doyle, and together they had two sons, Kevin and Terrence, and a daughter, Kathleen.

References

1988 deaths
Place of death missing
Place of birth missing
Year of birth missing
American sportswriters
The Washington Post journalists
Dick McCann Memorial Award recipients
Saint Joseph's University alumni